Tunisavia is a charter airline based in Tunis, Tunisia. Its main base is Tunis-Carthage International Airport.

History
Tunisavia was founded in 1974. It operates Air support to oil and gas companies, Medical evacuations, Aerial works, Business aviation, and Airport handling.

Fleet
The Tunisavia fleet includes the following aircraft:

Helicopters

Previously

External links

References

Airlines of Tunisia
Airlines established in 1974
Charter airlines
Economy of Tunis